Alfred Paul Hetschko (24 August 1898 – 18 April 1967) was an Austro-German music educator, Kapellmeister and composer, who rendered outstanding services to men's choir.

Life

Austrian-Silesian origins and musical studies 
Hetschko was born in the Austrian Silesia town of Bielitz, which was located on the Galician border. After primary school (1904–1909), he attended the K. K. Emperor Franz Joseph State Grammar School in the Moravian district town of Ostrava.

Afterwards he was first an elementary school teacher in Kunzendorf near Bielsko. From 1921 to 1923, he taught at the Protestant boys' school at Bielitz in the autonomous Voivodeship of Silesia. In parallel, he studied at the Charles University of Prague from 1918. In 1922, he acquired his teaching qualification for German and music at grammar schools. His academic teachers included  in music history,  (Prague) and Adolf Chybiński (Lviv).

Professional stations in areas with a German minority

Music teacher and choirmaster in Lemberg and Graudenz (1922-1932) 
From 1922 he taught at the German Realgymnasium in Lemberg (Lwiw) in the Lwów Voivodeship. Hetschko, who had passed his Kapellmeister examination at the Lviv Academy of Music, additionally worked as a guest conductor at orchestral concerts of the Türk Concert Directorate and the Polish Musicians' Association. In 1922 he also took over the direction of the Galician Germans men's chorus "Frohsinn" and, from 1923, of the independent German Men's Choral Society of Lviv. Hetschko also trained a women's choir and a mixed choir as well as smaller ensembles. He had works by classical, romantic and Baroque music composers performed in addition to Lied and folk songs by baroque composers, as well as singing an ecclesiastical programme. His activity inspired several choir foundations in the region.

He then became a music teacher in Grudziądz at the Goethe School. The predominantly Protestant student body, originating from West Prussia, was there educated to the German Volkstum and to loyal citizenship of the Polish state. From 1924 to 1932, Hetschko was music director and organist as well as conductor of the stage orchestra at the community theatre "Deutsche Bühne Graudenz", which was under the direction of Arnold Kriedte and had its seat in the former Protestant community hall. It was a replica of the stage in Bydgoszcz and was supported by the Berlin "Verein heimattreuer Graudenzer". At the age of 27 he was elected the first  of the Bund deutscher Gesangsvereine Posen-Pommerellen. He was also director of the Singakademie in Graudenz, which merged with the men's singing society "Liedertafel" in 1930, with which he gave public concerts. Among others, he performed the oratorios Christ on the Mount of Olives by Ludwig van Beethoven (1927) and The Seasons by Joseph Haydn (1932). He also maintained a close exchange with his Polish colleagues, making music with the Graudenz Conservatory Director Ignaci Tomaszewski.

Headmaster in Czechoslovakia, Reich Protectorate (1932-1945) 
In 1932, he went to Czechoslovakia: until 1933 he first worked as a choir and orchestra conductor in Brno. He was then a teacher at the German school in Košice, where he held the post of director in 1933/34. During this period, according to Rudolf Weidig, he openly opposed the aggressively nationalist politics of the Carpathian German Party and its sister party, the Carpathian German Party (KdP). In his estimation, the KdP suffered defeat in the 1937 Kashubian municipal election because of Hetschko's activities. The National Socialists had later accused and harassed him for that attitude and for other offences. On 1 July 1941 he joined the NSDAP (membership number 8,956,345) and belonged to the  Česká Třebová (Reichsgau Sudetenland). He was also a member of the National Socialist Teachers League. From 1942 to 1945, Hetschko taught at the secondary school and teacher training college in Dvůr Králové nad Labem in the Protectorate of Bohemia and Moravia. With the end of the war in 1945 his forced resettlement to the West was a success.

Work in the SBZ and the GDR

Post-war period in the Harz Mountains (1945-1948) 
In the Soviet occupation zone he was then entrusted with resettler welfare (Aschersleben) and agricultural surveys (Quedlinburg). He also organised cultural events. From 1946 to 1948, he was a theatre bandmaster and manager in Aschersleben. He founded the local district association of the Union of Art and the "Werk der Jugend". He also helped to constitute the impact group of the Cultural Association of the GDR.

Music adviser at ministerial level (1948-1952) 
He was then appointed to Halle an der Saale as trade union secretary for music and theatre affairs. Under his aegis, the reorganisation of school music took place, which among others led to the founding of music schools. In addition, in 1949 Hetschko received a teaching assignment at the  founded by Hans Stieber.

Management functions in higher education (from 1952) 
During this time he was a promoter of Neue Musik in Halle. However, his commitment to school music led to the discontinuation of teaching at the conservatoire. After the institution was taken over by the Pädagogische Hochschule Halle-Köthen in 1955, he became Professor and head of the music department there (until 1963). Furthermore, from 1953 to 1960 (together with Helmut Mahler) and from 1961 to May 1965, he was the first chairman of the Halle district executive committee of the art trade union and deputy chairman of the Halle district executive committee of the Gesellschaft zur Verbreitung wissenschaftlicher Kenntnisse. Hetschko, a member of the Socialist Unity Party of Germany, was a member of the federal executive committee of the Free German Trade Union Federation from 1955 to 1959 under Herbert Warnke. 

Hetschko was the author of a biography of Antonín Dvořák (1965). He published articles in daily newspapers and specialist journals (among others Musik und Gesellschaft). He also occasionally appeared as a composer (songs, choirs). In particular, he composed works for male choir.

Awards 
In 1961, he was honoured with the Handel Prize of the Halle district. In 1963, he received the Patriotic Order of Merit in bronze. He was also a bearer of the Fritz Heckert Medaille of the Free German Trade Union Federation.

Publications 
 Antonín Dvořák. [Biografie]. . (Vol. 253). Reclam, Leipzig, 1965.

Further reading 
 Peter Andraschke: "Hetschko, Alfred Paul." In Karl Walter Neumann (Bearb.): Ostschlesische Porträts. Biographisch-bibliographisches Lexikon von Österreichisch-Ostschlesien (Schriften der Stiftung Haus Oberschlesien. Landeskundliche Reihe. Vol. 2). Vol 2: E–H. Gebr. Mann, Berlin 1996, .
 Peter Andraschke: "Hetschko, Alfred Paul." In Sudetendeutsches Musikinstitut (ed.): Lexikon zur deutschen Musikkultur. Böhmen, Mähren, Sudetenschlesien. Vol. 1: A–L. Langen Müller, Munich 2000, pp. 542f.
 Hetschko, Alfred. In Minister of Intra-German Relations (ed.): SBZ-Biographie. Ein biographisches Nachschlagebuch über die sowjetische Besatzungszone Deutschlands. Zusammengestellt vom Untersuchungsausschuß Freiheitlicher Juristen, 3rd edition, Deutscher Bundes-Verlag, Bonn 1964, .
 Nina-Kathrin Behr: Hetschko, Alfred (Paul). In  (ed.): . Das 20. Jahrhundert. Biographisch-bibliographisches Handbuch, vol. 17: Henze – Hettwer. Verlag Saur, Zürich among others 2011, .
 Hetschko, Alfred Paul. In : Oberschlesisches Literatur-Lexikon. Biographisch-bibliographisches Handbuch (Schriften der Stiftung Haus Oberschlesien. Literaturwissenschaftliche Reihe. Bd. 1). Vol. 3: Q–Z. Mit Berichtigungen, Ergänzungen und Nachträgen zu Band 1 und 2. Palatina-Verlag, Heidelberg 2000, .
 Die Redaktion: Allred Hetschko verstorben. In Musik und Gesellschaft, 17 (1967) 6, .
 Hetschko, Alfred. In Horst Seeger: Musiklexikon. In zwei Bänden. Vol. 1: A–K. Deutscher Verlag für Musik VEB, Leipzig 1966, .
 Rudolf Weidig: Prof. Alfred Hetschko zum 65. Geburtstag. In Musik in der Schule, 14 (1963) 9. .

References

External links 

German music educators
Heads of schools in Germany
Music directors
German choral conductors
German classical organists
German theatre directors
20th-century classical composers
German classical composers
Austrian classical composers
Charles University alumni
Recipients of the Patriotic Order of Merit in bronze
Socialist Unity Party of Germany members
Nazi Party members
Austro-Hungarian people of World War I
Musicians from Bielsko-Biała
Austro-Hungarian musicians
1898 births
1967 deaths
People from Bielsko
People from Austrian Silesia
Silesian-German people